Speedtest.net, also known as Speedtest by Ookla, is a web service that provides free analysis of Internet access performance metrics, such as connection data rate and latency. It is the flagship product of Ookla, a web testing and network diagnostics company founded in 2006, and based in Seattle, Washington, United States.

The service measures the data throughput (speed) and latency (connection delay) of an Internet connection against one of around 11,000 geographically dispersed servers (as of August 2021). Each test measures the data rate for the download direction, i.e. from the server to the user computer, and the upload data rate, i.e. from the user's computer to the server. The tests are performed within the user's web browser or within apps.  , over 21 billion speed tests have been completed.

Tests were previously performed using the Hypertext Transfer Protocol (HTTP) at Layer 7 of the OSI model. To further improve accuracy, Speedtest.net now performs tests via direct Transmission Control Protocol (TCP) sockets and uses a custom protocol for communication between servers and clients.

The site also offers detailed statistics based on test results. This data has been used by numerous publications in the analysis of Internet access data rates around the world.

History
The owner and operator of Speedtest.net, Ookla, was established in 2006 by partners Mike Apgar and Doug Suttles. Suttles suggested the name Ookla because he already owned the Ookla.com domain name in honor of his pet cat, who was in turn named for a character on the TV series Thundarr the Barbarian. The domain speedtest.net has been used to host a speed test since 2000, speedtest.net only became known to the general public after the acquisition by Ookla in 2006. 

As of 2011, Ookla claimed 80% market share and was one of the top 1000 most popular websites. At the time, Ookla derived its revenue primarily from fees paid by companies to license custom speed test and proprietary testing software. Clients reportedly included media companies like CNN and Disney, and telecommunications providers like AT&T, Verizon, and CenturyLink.

Ookla was acquired by Ziff Davis in 2014.

Acquisitions

Technology
Speedtest.net started as a Flash based broadband speed test service. Ookla took years to port the speed test from Flash to HTML5. The new HTML5 based speed test went out of beta on January 9, 2018.

Speedtest.net data

Speedtest market reports
In 2016, Speedtest began releasing market reports for different countries and cities, providing raw statistics regarding download and upload speeds for the past year for ISPs and mobile carriers. It also includes analysis of the current ISP and mobile markets of the respective country and breakdowns by region and city. ISPs and mobile carriers are ranked by their geographic performance.

See also 
 List of countries by Internet connection speeds

References

Internet technology companies of the United States
Internet properties established in 2006
Network performance
Computer network analysis
Mobile applications
IOS software
Android (operating system) software
2014 mergers and acquisitions